Jewish Theological Seminary may refer to:
Jewish Theological Seminary of America
Jewish Theological Seminary of Breslau
Jewish Theological Seminary of Budapest